Branko Štrbac (born 25 July 1957) is a former Serbian handball player. In 1984 he was a member of the Yugoslav handball team which won the gold medal at the Olympics. In 1982 he was part of the Yugoslav team which won the silver medal in Dortmund, Germany. He won three championships (Yugoslav team season 1979/80; French team, USAM Nîmes Gard season 1987/88; Italian team, Cividin Trieste season 1990/91) including Yugoslavian cup by playing for RK Borac Banja Luka, season 1980/81.

External links
Olympic profile

1957 births
Living people
People from Herceg Novi
Yugoslav male handball players
Montenegrin male handball players
Serbian male handball players
Handball players at the 1984 Summer Olympics
Olympic handball players of Yugoslavia
Olympic gold medalists for Yugoslavia
Olympic medalists in handball
Medalists at the 1984 Summer Olympics
RK Crvena zvezda players
Serbs of Montenegro